Kock's mouse-eared bat (Myotis dieteri) is a species of mouse-eared bat found in the Republic of the Congo.

References

Endemic fauna of the Republic of the Congo
Mouse-eared bats
Mammals described in 2005
Bats of Africa